The Meishan Park is a park in Meishan Township, Chiayi County, Taiwan.

Geology
The park spans over an area of 6 hectares consisting of around 3,000 trees.

Facilities
The park is equipped with the sky corridor walking paths and tree house platform.

Transportation
The park is accessible by bus from Chiayi Station of Taiwan Railways.

See also
 List of parks in Taiwan

References

External links

 

Parks in Chiayi County